Eduin Becerra (born 28 September 1985) is a Venezuelan cyclist, who currently ride for Venezuelan amateur team Team Osorio Grupo Ciclismo.

Major results

2008
 3rd Overall Vuelta a Guatemala
 7th Overall Vuelta a Venezuela
2009
 5th Overall Vuelta al Táchira
 10th Overall Vuelta a Venezuela
2010
 7th Overall Tour de Guadeloupe
1st Stages 4 & 6
2011
 7th Overall Vuelta al Táchira
1st Stage 9
2012
 5th Time trial, National Road Championships
 6th Overall Vuelta al Táchira
 6th Overall Vuelta a Venezuela
2013
 National Road Championships
1st  Road race
4th Time trial
 5th Overall Vuelta al Táchira
2015
 1st Overall Vuelta a Trujillo
2016
 5th Time trial, National Road Championships
2017
 6th Overall Vuelta al Táchira
2018
 1st Stage 8a Tour de Martinique
2019
 1st Overall Tour de Martinique
1st Stages 4 & 8b (ITT)
2022
 2nd Overall Vuelta al Táchira
1st Stage 5

References

External links

1985 births
Living people
Venezuelan male cyclists
People from Mérida (state)
20th-century Venezuelan people
21st-century Venezuelan people